Caroline Olivier (born 22 December 1971) is a Canadian freestyle skier. She was born in Quebec. She competed at the 1994 Winter Olympics in Lillehammer, where she placed 8th in aerials. She also competed at the 1998 Winter Olympics in Nagano.

References

External links

 

1971 births
Living people
Sportspeople from Quebec
Canadian female freestyle skiers
Freestyle skiers at the 1994 Winter Olympics
Freestyle skiers at the 1998 Winter Olympics
Olympic freestyle skiers of Canada